Charles Paul Phipps (1815–1880), of Chalcot House, near Westbury, Wiltshire, was an English merchant in Brazil and later Conservative MP for Westbury (1869–1874) and High Sheriff of Wiltshire (1875).

Origins
Charles Paul Phipps was the eighth son of Thomas Henry Hele Phipps (1777–1841), of Leighton House, Westbury, Wiltshire, and Mary Michael Joseph Leckonby (1777–1835). The Phippses had originally emerged as prominent Wiltshire clothiers in the 16th century. Over the next hundred years prosperity propelled them into the ranks of the landed gentry but, by the early 19th century, the family found themselves in reduced financial circumstances.

Coffee merchant
In 1830, at the age of 15, Phipps was sent to Rio de Janeiro with twenty pounds in his pocket to seek his fortune. In 1837 he went into partnership with his older brother, John Lewis Phipps, buying out the Brazilian coffee business of Heyworth Brothers. Despite a number of alarms, the business eventually flourished, becoming for a while one of the largest coffee exporters from Brazil. Between 1850 and the mid-1870s, the volume of coffee exported by the firm increased from 94,000 to about half a million bags per annum (valued at £2,000,000).

Political career
In 1869, Phipps was elected as the Conservative Member of Parliament for Westbury, by 499 votes to 488 for the Liberal candidate, Abraham Laverton. He lost his seat to Laverton in 1874 by 22 votes.

Phipps died on 8 June 1880, having suffered a stroke the previous year.

Family
In 1844, Phipps married Emma Mary Benson, who came from a mercantile family, being the daughter of Moses Benson of Liverpool and granddaughter of Moses Benson (1738–1806). Their eldest son, Charles Nicholas Paul Phipps, was also subsequently MP for Westbury and High Sheriff of Wiltshire. Their second son, William Wilton Phipps, was the grandfather of both Joyce Grenfell and Simon Wilton Phipps MC, the Bishop of Lincoln.

References

Sources
Notes on the 'Westbury' Phipps Pedigrees, John C. Phipps (1983, unpublished)
Papers of the Phipps family of Leighton and Chalcot (Ref. 540) at the Wiltshire and Swindon History Centre (National Archives catalogue)

External links
 

1815 births
1880 deaths
19th-century English businesspeople
High Sheriffs of Wiltshire
Conservative Party (UK) MPs for English constituencies
UK MPs 1868–1874
Businesspeople in coffee
People from Westbury, Wiltshire